The Zeitschrift für Musikwissenschaft was a musicology magazine which was published by Breitkopf & Härtel in Leipzig, from 1918 to 1935. It was edited by the German Music Society or German Society for Musicology.

Since its first publication in 1918, the musicologist Alfred Einstein was the editor of the journal. During the era of National Socialism he was forced in 1933 to take over the editorial office of Max Schneider. Its successor was the Archiv für Musikforschung (AfMf), which appeared from 1936 to 1943. Publisher and editor were the same as before.

Note: The Frankfurter Zeitung für Musikwissenschaft (FZMw) edited by Wolfgang Krebs, Goethe University Frankfurt, from 1998 and now discontinued, is an unrelated journal.

References

External links 

 , Zeitschrift für Musikwissenschaft in the journal database of the Berlin State Library

Magazines established in 1918
German-language magazines
Magazines disestablished in 1935
Defunct magazines published in Germany
Music magazines published in Germany
Magazines published in Leipzig